The X Display Manager (XDM) is the default display manager for the X Window System. It is a bare-bones X display manager. It was introduced with X11 Release 3 in October 1988, to support the standalone X terminals that were just coming onto the market. It was written by Keith Packard.

It can be configured using modules and scripts.

Because of XDM's minimalism, most desktop environments tend to use later, more sophisticated display managers.

See also

 X display manager

References

Further reading

External links
 
 
 

Free system software
Software using the MIT license
X display managers
Free software programmed in C
Free software programmed in C++